State Road 218 (NM 218) is a  state highway in the US state of New Mexico. NM 218's western terminus is at NM 18 and NM 132 in Hobbs, and the eastern terminus is at U.S. Route 62 (US 62) and US 180 in Hobbs.

Major intersections

See also

References

External links

218
Transportation in Lea County, New Mexico